Diglipur (sometimes spelled Diglipore) is the largest town of North Andaman Island, in the Andaman Archipelago, India. It is crossed by the Kalpong River, the only river of the Andaman islands. Saddle Peak, the highest point in the archipelago, lies about 10 km to the south. Diglipur is also a county (tehsil) of the North and Middle Andaman District of the Andaman and Nicobar Islands union territory. Its area is 884 km2, and its population was 42,877 people as of 2001.

Resources
Demographic Features

As per the population census in 2011, the total number of households listed under Diglipur tehsil was 10,702.

Land Utilization of revenue surveyed area under Diglipur Sub-Division

Infrastructure 

 Roads : Out of 34 Revenue villages, 27 villages are connected by tarmac road except for three villages i.e. Sagardweep, Nischintapur, and Jagannathdera due to cut off areas from ATR. The newly notified 04 revenue villages i.e. Paschimsagar, Gandhinagar, Shantinagar & Ganeshnagar are also not connected with the tarmac road.
 Drinking Water Source: Throughout Diglipur Tehsil drinking water is supplied through the pipeline by the APWD department from the source of Kalpong River. In some cut-off villages i.e. Nischintapur, Jagannathdera, Paschimsagar, Gandhinagar, Shantinagar & Ganeshnagar ring wells are the source of water.
 Transports: Diglipur Tehsil can be accessed through all the three modes of transport road, sea, and air transport as necessary infrastructures are readily available over here to facilitate these services.

 Road Transport: Road transport plays a vital role in the development of the Tehsil at large. Most of the businessmen are depend on road transport for running their commercial activities throughout the Tehsil because road transport is largely considered as easy and time-saving. Diglipur Tehsil is connected by road with the District HQ at Mayabunder. A good number of private and Govt. buses are plying throughout the Tehsil and providing routine services from Baratang to Diglipur via Rangat and vice versa. Apart from this, private and Govt. buses are also rendering daily express service from Port Blair to Diglipur and vice versa.
 Sea Transport: Diglipur is connected by sea transport as well. A jetty at Aerial Bay plays a vital role in the routine boat services from Port Blair to Diglipur and vice versa with three to four trips in a week.
 Air-Transport: Helipad at Vidyasagar Pally is the only infrastructure for air transport. But, from 2011, Diglipur was linked with Port Blair by Seaplane services, which has been discontinued. Presently,  Pawan Hans Helicopters are plying Diglipur-Port Blair and vice versa 4 days in a week.

Health Service 
Diglipur Tehsil is having a Community Health Center at Diglipur and Primary Health Centers at Radhanagar, Kalighat, and Kishorinagar. With in the boundary of this Tehsil altogether 18 Sub-centers are in operation.

Almost all the healthcare delivery is done by Government centers :
Community Health Centre : 1 (at Diglipur)
Primary Health Centres (PHC) : 3 (Kalighat, KishoriNagar and Radhanagar | One PHC is proposed in Kalipur)
Health Sub Centre : 14
Dispensary 1

Education 
The education services of Diglipur Tehsil is generally considered to be good. Under the Tehsil about 06 Govt. Senior Secondary Schools are in operation of which one each at Diglipur, Sitanagar, Kishorinagar, Subhashgram, Swarajgram, and Kalighat.

Data on the distribution of Schools within the Tehsil boundary is figured in the table given below.

Government School

Private Management Schools

All these schools are running under Diglipur Sub-Division. Out of these 10 Primary schools and 01 Secondary schools are looked after by the assistant director, Mayabunbder. The enrollment of students except the school look after by the assistant director, Mayabunder is as under :

Enrollment in Govt. Schools             –        8996

Enrollment in Private Schools           –        1014

Social Welfare 
Altogether 113 Anganwadi, 4 Day Care Centers, and 02 Mini-Anganwadi are in operation within the Tehsil by the ICDS Project, North Andaman. Besides this other welfare schemes like Widow Pension, Old Age Pension, Pension to Handicapped are being provided by the Social Welfare Board through ICDS.

Tele Communication 
Services of GSM, 3G, 4G, Broadband, WLL, Land Line, Leased Line are provided in Diglipur area.

Connectivity through Satellite and OFC (Port Blair to Diglipur).

Mobile coverage Ramakrishnagram, Sitanagar, Nabagram, Kalighat, Ramnagar, Kishorinagar, Madhupur, Laxmipur, Radhanagar, Diglipur, Aerial Bay & Shibpur.

Fixed-line services in remote area like, Kishorinagar, Kalighat, Madhyamgram, Radhanagar, and Shibpur.

Broadband services in  remote area like Shibpur, Kishorinagar, and Kalighat.

Postal services 
Altogether, 01 Sub-Post Office and 11 ED Branch Post Offices are in operation under Diglipur Tehsil. Besides, private courier services like Andaman Express and AIR Express have their respective branches at Diglipur for facilitating courier services in and out of the Islands.

Banking Services 
As in other parts of the Islands State Bank of India is providing Banking Service under Diglipur Tehsil. Whereas, A & N State Co-operative Bank is also providing services at Diglipur, Aerial Bay and Kalighat. Axis Bank and Syndicate Bank are also open in Diglipur.

Law and Order 
Within the limit of Diglipur Tehsil, two police stations are there one each at Diglipur and Kalighat. These Police Stations are largely responsible for the maintenance of law and order within the Tehsil.

Fishing Sector 
Diglipur Tehsil is endowed with vast and varied fisheries resources in terms of species diversity of fish, ornamental fish, shellfish, and mollusk. A large proportion of the population is involved in fishing and allied activities for their income. There are 514 registered fishing boats in operation which provide a livelihood for 1200 active fisherman families. Besides marine fishery, people of Diglipur are also involved in culturing freshwater fish with more than 700 available ponds. The majority of people are non-vegetarian eater and relish fish and shellfish cuisine as a preferred dish. Department of fisheries works for the welfare and development of fishermen and fish farmers and sustainable fisheries & aquaculture as a whole.

There is one fish landing center at Durgapur.

There is one fish drying platform at Durgapur for benefit of fishermen.

There is one Ice Plant and Cold Storage for the preservation of fishes at Durgapur village. Fishermen are availing of the facilities.

Forest 
Diglipur Tehsil partly comes under the jurisdiction of North Andaman Forest Division. Total Geographic area of this division is 1238 km2 in which reserved forest area is 83.08 km2, Protected forest area is 963.04 km2 and non-forest area is 191.88 km2.

Panchayati Raj Institution 
Panchayati Raj Institutions: Diglipur Tehsil is having 34 revenue villages and these villages are locally governed by 15 Gram Panchayats. The list of limitations of each Panchayat and its Pradhan is furnished as under:

Power 
Power Generation at Kalpong HE Project:- There are 3 turbines of 1750 KW Capacity each working at Kalpong Hydro Electric Project.

There are 3 generator sets of 1000 KV & 03 generator sets of 320 KV Capacity at Sitanagar Power House.

Defence 
There are four Defence Establishment as given below:

Disaster Management 
Disaster Management: As a measure to cope up with disasters, following government building/structures have been identified as an immediate temporary relief shelter in each revenue village.

Details of the village wise identified relief shelter is as under:-

Agriculture
, Diglipur's chief agricultural products were rice (about 6500 ha), coconuts (3600 ha), rabi pulses (2900 ha), areca nuts (1300 ha) and bananas (650 ha).

Tourism
The city also profits from tourism to nearby attractions in North Andaman, which include the Ross and Smith islands, the Saddle Peak National Park, the beaches at Ram Nagar, Kalipur, and Lamiya bay, and mud volcanoes. Ram Nagar beach ( away from Kalighat) is famous for sea turtle nesting from December to February.

The first hydroelectric power station of the islands (5.25 MW) is set up in the Kalpong River.

The Chalis Ek Caves (about  due south of Diglipur, near the village of Pathi Level) and the Alfred Caves are a major nesting ground for the edible-nest swiftlet, whose nests are exported to China for bird's nest soup.

Mud Volcano at Diglipur
The mud volcanoes at North Andaman are described by locals as better than those found in Baratang Islands. Till now local administration has made no efforts of accessibility of tourists to this place.

Ross Island
The small Ross Island, a 20-minute boat ride from Aerial Bay jetty, is an ideal spot for beach tourism, adventure (trekking through tropical forest), research / education (like scuba diving, snorkeling, turtle nesting). The sand bar joining this island with the larger Smith Island is an added attraction. This Ross Island is not to be confused with the Ross Island, South Andaman district, near Port Blair.

Smith Island
Smith Island offers a similar experience to the small adjoining Ross Island. Smith Island has a village of about 60 families. Eco rest houses are available for overnight stay. The beach is notified for turtle nesting during seasons.

Kalipur Beach
Lamiya Bay is quite near the Kalipur beach. Kalipur Adventure Sports Complex, near Kalipur Beach offers water adventure sports such as speed boats, water scooters etc. The complex however suffers administrative apathy and requires facelift. Lamiya Bay Beach (or locally Lemiyar Bay) borders the Saddle Peak National Park | National Parks |. This beautiful beach has a stretch of shore covered with shells. At the end of this walk is a refreshing fresh water stream 'Thambu Nali' in the foothills of National Park.

Saddle Peak National Park
Is a dense tropical forest housing a rich bank of exquisite trees, (including sandal), rare flora and wild fruits and offering trekking opportunities including climbing up natural steps formed by the roofs of old trees. Tourists need to take permission from Forest Department to trek through this Park.
A 740 feet climb leads to Saddle Peak, the highest point in A&N islands which offers an aerial view of A&N, the second peak "ice degree peak" is the coldest point while the third peak provides a fantastic view spanning Diglipur to Mayabunder.

Tourists
The tourist season in North Andaman [Diglipur] is between the months of November and March in a year. The present tourist inflow in a season is an estimated 1000 only of which ~90% are domestic tourists and the rest foreign nationals. This translates to a low average of 6 tourists per day in season. The average stay period of a foreign tourist is put at 10 days to a fortnight and the same drops to 1–3 days in case of a domestic tourist.

Local travel in North Andaman
For local travel STS buses (Govt.) and private buses are available. The public transport services run between 04:30 and 19:30 hours. There are also about 45 autos and few jeeps/Omni Vans as an alternative to public transport on the island. Fishermen  (locally called , dinghy/machine ) are available for inter-island travel. Charges for these  have to be negotiated. Doongis may not be to everyone's liking as they are uncomfortable and makes a loud monotonous noise. They are usually open-top and without any life rafts or jackets and therefore unsafe for sea travel as well.

The inter-island boat visit to Aerial Bay jetty thrice in a week, Monday, Wednesday & Saturday, departs from Port Blair 07.00 Hrs & arrives 15.15 Hrs, and returns Tuesday 07.00 Hrs, Wed & Sat 21.00 Hrs.

Power supply 
Power supply to this island is from the 5.5 MW hydro electric project of NHPC. The present power supply situation is satisfactory with occasional power cuts due to stabilization problems in the plant. The present capacity is said to be sufficient to meet the power requirements of Diglipur, Mayabunder and Rangat islands. The Kalpong River project has a 34- meter high concrete dam on the left fork of the river Kalpong, a    rock-fill dam on the right fork,  in-take approach channel, and a 133-metre long in-take tunnel. The Kalpong river traverses in the northward direction for a length of about  before it joins the Aerial Bay Creek on the east coast near Diglipur

Water supply
Water supply is from the perennial Kalpong river, the only river in the whole of A&N islands. The water supply situation is satisfactory till date. However, construction of dam for hydro electric project has raised concerns on sustainability of maintaining the present water supply levels.

Villages
In 2001, the townships (gram panchayats) and subordinated villages in Diglipur county were:

 Diglipur: Khudirampur
 Gandhi Nagar: Ganesh Nagar, Shanti Nagar
 Kalighat: Jagannath Dera
 Keralapuram: Vidyasagar Pally, Aerial Bay, Sagardweep, Gandhi Nagar
 Kishorinagar: Parangara, Mohanpur
 Laxmipur: Milangram
 Madhupur: Rabindra Pally, Deshbandugram
 Nabagram: Nischintapur, Madhyamgram
 Paschimsaga
 Radha Nagar: Shyam Nagar, Swarajgram
 Ramakrishnagram
 Ramnagar
 Shibpur: Kalipur, Durgapur
 Sitanagar: Krishnapuri
 Subashgram: Diglipur

References

Cities and towns in North and Middle Andaman district
North Andaman Island